The Debantbach is a stream in East Tyrol, Austria. At the end of the Debanttal Valley, the Debantbach joins the Gößnitzbach and then flows through the Debanttal and into the Drava at Dölsach. It takes in a total of 48 bodies of water (including tributaries and their tributaries).

Name 
Different etymologies have been suggested for the name "Debant". One possibility is that it comes from a Celtic place name, such as Deva or Debana, ultimately deriving from the Latin divius ("divine"). Another suggestion is that the name is derived from the Slavic root djeva ("girl").

References

Tributaries of the Drava
Rivers of Tyrol (state)
Rivers of Austria